Antti Verner Hackzell (20 September 1881 – 14 January 1946) was a Finnish politician from the National Coalition Party and Prime Minister of Finland from August to September 1944.

Career

Hackzell was the Governor of Viborg Province (1918–1920), the Envoy (later Chargé d'affaires) of Finland to the Soviet Union (1922–1927) and served as the deputy director (1930–1936) and director (1936–1945) of Finnish Employers Association. Hackzell was also the Minister of Foreign Affairs 1932–1936 in the cabinet of Toivo Kivimäki.

In summer 1944 Hackzell was chosen to form a government with the goal of signing a peace treaty with the Soviet Union. Hackzell suffered a stroke in  Savoy Hotel in  Moscow while on peace treaty negotiations on 14 September, and he never recovered completely. His minister of foreign affairs, Carl Enckell, concluded the negotiations.

Family origins 

The Hackzell family name derives from the Hacksta family estate, located in Hacksta, Uppland in Sweden.  Through Mårten Hackzell, the only child of the Uppland clergyman Andreas Hackzelius, and through Mårten's offspring, the Hackzell family spread to Norrland and Finland.

Cabinets
 Hackzell Cabinet

References

External links
 

1881 births
1946 deaths
People from Mikkeli
People from Mikkeli Province (Grand Duchy of Finland)
Finnish people of Swedish descent
National Coalition Party politicians
Prime Ministers of Finland
Ministers for Foreign Affairs of Finland
Members of the Parliament of Finland (1939–45)
Finnish people of World War II
University of Helsinki alumni
World War II political leaders